Carlos Yahir Elizalde Gómez (born 10 November 1993 in Zapopan, Jalisco) is a Mexican professional footballer who last played for Pacific.

References

External links
 

1993 births
Living people
Association football defenders
Atlas F.C. footballers
Alianza Panama players
Liga Premier de México players
Tercera División de México players
Liga Panameña de Fútbol players
Mexican expatriate footballers
Mexican expatriate sportspeople in Panama
Expatriate footballers in Panama
People from Zapopan, Jalisco
Footballers from Jalisco
Mexican footballers